The College of Radiology, Academy of Medicine Malaysia is a non-profit organization of clinical radiologists, clinical oncologists, and medical physicists in Malaysia.

It was established as the Malaysian Radiological Society (MRS) following the inaugural general meeting held on November 27, 1976, at the then General Hospital, Kuala Lumpur. On August 23, 2001, the MRS became a chapter in the Academy of Medicine of Malaysia and from then on is known by its current name.

It has adopted Biomedical Imaging and Intervention Journal as its official publication.

See also
Biomedical Imaging and Intervention Journal

References

Medical and health organisations based in Malaysia
Professional associations based in Malaysia
Organizations established in 1976
1976 establishments in Malaysia